Soltanabad (also Romanized as Solţānābād and Sultānabād) is a village in Azghand Rural District, Shadmehr District, Mahvelat County, Razavi Khorasan Province, Iran. At the 2006 census, its population was 899, in 218 families.

References 

Populated places in Mahvelat County